Donald Matthew Panciera (June 23, 1927 – February 9, 2012) was an American football quarterback, halfback, and defensive back in the All-America Football Conference and the National Football League. He played for the New York Yankees (AAFC), the Detroit Lions, and the Chicago Cardinals. He played college football for the Boston College Eagles and the San Francisco Dons.

High school football
He was a two time first-team All-State quarterback honors for La Salle Academy in 1944 and 1945. He quarterbacked La Salle teams to some of the school's greatest seasons. As a senior in 1945 he led the Maroon to an undefeated season and a trip to New Orleans for a special high school bowl game at Tulane Stadium.

College football
He was a starting quarterback for Boston College and the University of San Francisco.

Pro football
Despite being selected by the Philadelphia Eagles in the 4th Round of the 1949 NFL Draft, Panciera joined the New York Yankees of the All-America Football Conference who selected him in the sixth round of the 1949 AAFC Draft. In 12 games, he completed 51 of 150 passes for 5 touchdowns and 16 interceptions. The conference folded after the 1949 season, so in 1950 Panciera played defensive back for the Detroit Lions, recording 1 interception in 4 games. In 1952, he joined the Chicago Cardinals of the National Football League. In 8 games he completed 35 of 96 passes for 582 yards, 5 touchdowns, and 9 interceptions. In 1953, he joined the Toronto Argonauts of the Canadian Rugby Union, but appeared in only 1 game.

After Football
After his playing days he served as an assistant coach at the University of Dayton for three years and Boston College for a year. In 1960, he began working for General Motors in New England and in 1970 was awarded a GM dealership in Wakefield, Rhode Island.

External links
databaseFootball.com Profile

1927 births
2012 deaths
American football quarterbacks
American football defensive backs
Boston College Eagles football players
San Francisco Dons football players
New York Yankees (AAFC) players
Detroit Lions players
Chicago Cardinals players
American players of Canadian football
Toronto Argonauts players
Dayton Flyers football coaches
Boston College Eagles football coaches
Canadian football quarterbacks
La Salle Academy alumni
People from Westerly, Rhode Island
Players of American football from Rhode Island